Sezairi Sezali (born 6 August 1987), more commonly known just as Sezairi, is a Malay Singaporean musician and singer-songwriter. Sezairi rose to prominence after winning the third season of Singapore Idol in 2009.

Sezairi signed with major label Sony Music Entertainment in 2015. In 2016, he released his self-titled EP. On 30 January 2020, he released his latest EP Undertones. In 2022, he became the first Singaporean artiste to achieve more than 100 million streams on Spotify.

Early life 
Inheriting genes from his father who is an avid audiophile, Sezairi first discovered music at the age of 5 years old. His very first song was "Isabella", a Malay rock song popularised by the band Search in the 90s. He soon found himself sharing the same love for music. At the age of 14, he picked up the guitar to accompany his singing. That led him to form the band Juxtapose with him as frontman. With the band, Sezairi was first able to hone his skills as a musician, as well as a songwriter. It helped prepare him for what was to come in the Singapore Idol series, a nationwide televised singing competition in 2009.

Personal life 
Sezairi solemnised his marriage to long-time girlfriend Syaza Qistina on 23 January 2016. The closed door affair for 150 guests was held at the Timbre Music Academy Hall in Old Parliament Lane, with many of them from the local entertainment scene, including The Sam Willows' Benjamin Kheng, rappers Sheikh Haikel and Kevin Lester.

In August 2016, a grand wedding dinner at the SAF Yacht Club in Changi was held to celebrate Sezairi’s nuptials with his wife. Members of homegrown bands were spotted at the wedding, including The Sam Willows, 53A, composer Jeremy Monteiro and 987FM radio DJ Tabitha Nauser. Comedian Fakkah Fuzz was the emcee for the evening and singer-songwriter Charlie Lim performed a song for the couple.

Career 
In 2009, Sezairi participated in the third season of nationwide televised singing competition series, Singapore Idol. He won the season, winning the hearts of many with his boy-next-door charm. He released his debut album "Take Two" in June 2010, with good reviews. "Broken", the first single of the album, was the highest ranking Asian song of 2010 on 987FM, one of Singapore’s top pop radio stations.

He was signed to Sony Music Singapore in 2014 and has released his self-titled EP, SEZAIRI, featuring his first hit single "Fire To The Floor".

In 2020, he released the EP Undertones, featuring evocative ballad ‘It’s You.’ The song has surpassed 10 million listens online and has acquired GOLD certification since its release. ‘It’s You’ was featured Apple Music’s “Best of 2018: Editors’ Picks” Global Playlist, where it sat on the 3rd spot amongst some of the year’s most identifiable and noteworthy songs.

Sezairi has branched out into acting too, with his acting debut in the local historical feature film 1965, and he appeared in W!LD RICE's December pantomime, The Emperor's New Clothes as well.

Sezairi released his third album, Violets Aren't Blue, on 8 July 2022.

Filmography

Movies

Discography

Albums

Extended plays

Awards and nominations

References

External links

	
	
	

1987 births
Living people
Idols (TV series) winners
Singaporean male actors
Singaporean jazz musicians
21st-century Singaporean male singers
Singaporean pop singers
Singaporean singer-songwriters
Jazz pianists
Jazz guitarists
Jazz fusion musicians
Male pianists
21st-century pianists
21st-century guitarists
21st-century Singaporean actors
Male jazz musicians